My Name Is Thomas ( or La chiamavano Maryam) is a 2018 Italian drama film directed by Terence Hill and starring Hill alongside Matt Patresi, Eva Basteiro-Bertoli, Veronica Bitto and Guia Jelo. The film is the return of Terence Hill since he appeared in Doc West (2009).

It is produced by Luisa Tonon and Jess Hill, Terence's son, and distributed by Lux Vide, the same distributor of Don Matteo.

The film is dedicated to Bud Spencer when, on 27 June 2016, before the end of the shooting of the film, Spencer died. It was released on 19 April 2018.

Film was presented on 8 December 2016 in the program Rischiatutto, conducted by Fabio Fazio, where Terence Hill showed the trailer. In March 2018 was announced the final release of the film on 19 April.

It was shot in Almería in locations as parque de las Almadrabillas, port of Almeria, Cable Inglés, Tabernas and Pescadería.

Plot 
Thomas starts from Italy to reach the desert in the Almeria area where he can meditate on the pages of a book he loves in a special way. Shortly after the departure on his Harley Davidson, he helps a girl, Lucia, to escape from two undesirable types from whom she stole money.

Cast
 Eva Basteiro-Bertoli as Dottoressa
 Francesca Beggio as Maria
 Veronica Bitto as Lucia
 Terence Hill as Thomas
 Guia Jelo as Zia Rosario
 Andy Luotto as Priore
 Giovanni Malafronte as Cameriere
 Matt Patresi as Max
 Cinzia Susino as Dottoressa nave

References

External links
 

Films shot in Almería
Films shot in Rome
2010s drama road movies
Motorcycling films
Italian drama road movies
2018 drama films
Films directed by Terence Hill